{{Speciesbox
| status =
| status_system =
| status_ref = 
| taxon = Iniistius melanopus
| authority = Bleeker, 1857
| synonyms =
 Novacula melanopus Bleeker, 1857

 Hemipteronotus melanopus (Bleeker, 1857)

 Xyrichtys melanopus (Bleeker, 1857)
}}Iniistius melanopus'', the yellowpatch razorfish, is a species of marine ray-finned fish 
from the family Labridae, the wrasses. It is found in the Indo-West Pacific.   

References

melanopus
Taxa named by Pieter Bleeker
Fish described in 1857